George Shields was an Australian politician.

George Shields may also refer to:

George Shields, character in Allotment Wives

See also
George Shiels (1881–1949), Irish dramatist
George F. Shiels (1863–1943), surgeon and Medal of Honor recipient
George Shield (1876–1935), British politician